In statistics and social sciences, an antecedent variable is a variable that can help to explain the apparent relationship (or part of the relationship) between other variables that are nominally in a cause and effect relationship. In a regression analysis, an antecedent variable would be one that influences both the independent variable and the dependent variable.

See also
Path analysis (statistics)
Latent variable
Intervening variable
Confounding variable

References

Regression analysis
Independence (probability theory)
Design of experiments